La 7 is an autonomous television channel for the Region of Murcia, Spain. It is owned by Televisión Autonómica de Murcia, S.A. (TAM, S.A.)

Test transmissions began on 14 April 2006, with the main launch on 20 September 2006.

Logos 
SDTV version:

HDTV version:

External links
 

Television stations in Spain
Television channels and stations established in 2006
Spanish-language television stations